Matthew Golding (born 1985) is a Canadian ballet dancer and was a principal dancer with the Royal Ballet and a principal with the Dutch National Ballet (Het Nationale Ballet) in Amsterdam, The Netherlands.

Early life

Golding was born in the Canadian province of Saskatchewan, where he started dancing at age eight.

Career
He began his professional ballet training at 14, at the Royal Winnipeg Ballet School, then moved on to the Kirov Academy of Ballet in Washington DC, where he studied in class of Vladimir Djouloukhadze on a full scholarship for two years. At 16, Golding received the prestigious Prix de Lausanne, which gave him the opportunity to study at The Royal Ballet School in London, where he graduated with honors. Golding also won the Youth America Grand Prix in New York in 2002.

Golding joined ABT's Studio Company in September 2003 and the main company as an apprentice in April 2004.

He joined the Royal Ballet as a Principal Dancer in February 2014  but left the company in 2017. Since then, Golding has been a guest artist with the Hong Kong Ballet playing Conrad in Le Corsaire.

References

External links 
 Matthew Golding in Don Quixote, the complete ballet on YouTube 
 American Ballet Theatre bio
 Film credits 

1986 births
Living people
Canadian male ballet dancers
American Ballet Theatre dancers
Prix de Lausanne winners
Dutch National Ballet principal dancers
Principal dancers of The Royal Ballet